Ross Kneebone (born 1 August 1956) is a New Zealand cricketer. He played in two List A matches for Northern Districts in 1992/93.

See also
 List of Northern Districts representative cricketers

References

External links
 

1956 births
Living people
New Zealand cricketers
Northern Districts cricketers
Cricketers from Hamilton, New Zealand